Briggswath is a village in the Scarborough district of North Yorkshire, England.

Villages in North Yorkshire